Qahvaj (also Romanized as Qahvej; also known as Ghahooj, Qahwa, and Qahwach) is a village in Shahidabad Rural District, Central District, Avaj County, Qazvin Province, Iran. At the 2006 census, its population was 849, in 166 families.

References 

Populated places in Avaj County